Scott Mills Sipprelle is a venture capitalist and was the 2010 Republican candidate for Congress in . Sipprelle founded Westland Ventures, a Jackson, Wyoming-based investment firm, which helps emerging companies by providing growth capital.

Early life and education
Scott Sipprelle was born in Santa Barbara, California, where his father was a high school history teacher. Later, his parents joined the US Foreign Service and Scott spent much of his childhood living abroad, primarily in Latin America, Europe, and the Middle East.
Sipprelle graduated Phi Beta Kappa from Hamilton College in 1985 with a B.A. in Economics along with a minor in government. He was the recipient of the Clark Prize in Public Speaking.

Business career
In 2007 Sipprelle founded the investment firm, Westland Ventures. Westland Ventures provides growth capital for emerging companies. Westland Ventures has invested in many young companies, including Voxnest, Narragansett Brewing, and The Bank of Princeton. Sipprelle has served as Chairman of the Advisory Board for The Bank of Princeton.

Previously, Sipprelle was a senior executive in the financial services industry. From 1985 to 1998 Sipprelle worked for Morgan Stanley, where, at 32, he became a managing director. He later managed the firm's Equity Capital Markets Division, where he was responsible for managing the initial public offering process for many companies, including the landmark IPO of Netscape in 1994.

In 1998, Sipprelle left Morgan Stanley to launch the investment firm Midtown Research, which subsequently became Copper Arch Capital. Sipprelle's firm gained notoriety for instigating a shareholder revolt against cronyism and mismanagement at Morgan Stanley that eventually toppled the CEO, Phil Purcell. After a decade of managing capital for endowments and foundations, Sipprelle closed his fund in November 2007, a few months before the global stock markets collapsed.

Political career
Sipprelle first became interested in politics when, as a college student, he served as an intern for California Senator Pete Wilson. On the night of January 13, 2010, Sipprelle announced his intention of running for New Jersey's 12th District Congressional seat. Sipprelle promised to focus on "common-sense solutions" and to take back Washington from the career politicians. This was Sipprelle's first run for political office, and in a statement he said, "I'm not running for Congress simply to be competitive or put up a good fight." In a vow to be an independent voice on Capitol Hill Sipprelle said, "Frankly, any Congressman — of either party — who votes with his party boss 98 or 99 percent of the time is just a cog in the partisan machine that is tearing this country apart. He is not exercising wisdom, principle or good judgment, or putting his country first. You deserve better."

Sipprelle was criticized later in January for his contribution to the congressional campaigns of Blue Dog Democrats Allen Boyd of Florida, Charlie Melancon of Louisiana, Heath Shuler of North Carolina, Baron Hill of Indiana, and Stephanie Herseth Sandlin of South Dakota.

On the night of June 8, Primary Election Day, Sipprelle won the Republican Primary over challenger David Corsi by a margin of 54-46.

On November 2, 2010, six-term incumbent Rush Holt defeated Scott Sipprelle 53%-46%, with independent Kenneth J. Cody receiving 1%.

Personal life
Sipprelle married his college sweetheart, Tracy. They are the parents of three children Jessica, David, and Stephen. Sipprelle and his family live in Jackson, Wyoming, United States.

In September 2009 Sipprelle published his first novel, The Golden Dog, a mystery set on Wall Street.

References

External links
 
Campaign contributions at OpenSecrets.org

Living people
People from Princeton, New Jersey
New Jersey Republicans
Philanthropists from New York (state)
1963 births
American financial businesspeople
21st-century American novelists
American male novelists
Hamilton College (New York) alumni
21st-century American male writers